Tyler Diep is a Vietnamese-American politician who served one term in the California State Assembly. A Republican, he represented the 72nd Assembly District, which encompasses parts of northern coastal Orange County which includes the cities of Huntington Beach, Garden Grove, Westminster, Fountain Valley, Seal Beach, Los Alamitos, and the unincorporated areas of Midway City and Rossmoor.

Political career 
At the age of twenty-three, Diep was first elected as a director of the Midway City Sanitary District in 2006 and left this position at the end of 2018 after serving three consecutive 4-year terms due to his election to the State Assembly.  After being defeated for re-election to the Assembly in the 2020 primary election, Diep successfully ran in the 2020 general election to return to a director's seat at the Midway City Sanitary District.

Concurrently with his initial tenure at the Midway City Sanitary District, Diep was also elected to the  Westminster City Council in 2008 and in 2014. He was unanimously selected as Vice Mayor in 2010 and 2018. Professionally, he served as a senior adviser and small business outreach specialist with the California State Board of Equalization and the California Department of Tax and Fee Administration. In addition, he is also a proud small business owner in Huntington Beach.

For the 2019–20 legislative session, Diep served as vice-chair for the Housing and Community Development Committee and the Committee on Arts, Entertainment, Sports, Tourism, and Internet Media. He also served as a member of the Appropriations, Public Safety, Transportation, Labor and Employment, and the Joint Legislative Audit Committee.

In July 2019, Diep apologized for using anti-semitic stereotypes in his campaign mailers the previous year against his opponent, Josh Lowenthal. The stereotypes in question depicted Lowenthal "with an enlarged nose and clutching $100 bills."

In 2019, Diep introduced a bill, AB 317, to prohibit private companies from selling DMV appointments. It passed.

In the state Assembly, Diep compiled a moderate record and broke with his party on key issues. Lyft funded a $2 million campaign to unseat Diep, due to his stance on Assembly Bill 5, which categorized rideshare drivers as employees rather than independent contractors. Uber also gave $200,000 to a similar PAC. Partly as a result, he was defeated in the primary by former state Senator Janet Nguyen, who went on to win the November general election.

Personal life
Diep graduated with a degree in public administration from San Diego State University and currently resides in Westminster.

2018 election results

2020 election

References

External links 
 
 Campaign website
 Join California Tyler Diep

Republican Party members of the California State Assembly
California city council members
San Diego State University alumni
People from Westminster, California
1983 births
Living people
Vietnamese emigrants to the United States
California politicians of Vietnamese descent
21st-century American politicians
Asian conservatism in the United States